The International Association for the Philosophy of Law and Social Philosophy (IVR) is a learned society for science and was founded in 1909 as the "Internationale Vereinigung für Rechts- und Wirtschaftsphilosophie". It was renamed to "Internationale Vereinigung für Rechts- und Sozialphilosophie" in 1933. The IVR is the world's central academic organization for the study and advancement of legal and social philosophy.

Mission

The primary activities of the IVR include a World Congress every two years, publication of the international journal Archiv für Rechts- und Sozialphilosophie (ARSP), and the IVR Encyclopedia of the Philosophy of Law and Social Philosophy. The seat of IVR is in Wiesbaden, in the Federal Republic of Germany.

The IVR is divided into autonomous national sections embracing most of the nations of the world.

Many notable academics have served as president of the organization, including Neil MacCormick (Scotland), Ulfrid Neumann (Germany), Enrico Pattaro (Italy), Eugenio Bulygin (Argentina) and Mortimer Sellers (U.S.).

History

Founding and early years
The International Association for the Philosophy of Law and Social Philosophy (IVR) was founded in 1909 as the “Internationale Vereinigung für Rechts- und Wirtschaftsphilosophie”. Two years earlier, the journal "Archiv für Rechts- und Wirtschaftsphilosphie mit besonderer Berücksichtigung der Gesetzgebungsfragen" ("Archive for Philosophy of Law and Economic Philosophy with special Regard to the Issues of Legislation") had been established. The foundation of the "Archive" took place during a phase of revivification of the philosophy of law in Germany, which began at the end of the 19th century and continued to spread at the beginning of the 20th century. The founding fathers of both the "Archive" in 1907 and two years later of the IVR were Josef Kohler (1849–1919) and Fritz Berolzheimer (1869–1920).

Founding father Fritz Berolzheimer (1869–1920): From Arthur Kohler's essay "Von der Wiege des Archivs" (From the cradle of the Archive) from 1930/31 we know that the idea for founding a journal for the philosophy of law on a neo-idealistic basis came from Fritz Berolzheimer, a lawyer and private scholar from Munich. This idea coincided with Kohler's distinctive interest in founding new academic enterprises. Both men knew each other from academic correspondence, which derived from the publishing of Berolzheimer's five-volume "System der Rechts- und Wirtschaftsphilosophie" ("A system of Philosophy of Law and Economic Philosophy", 1904–1907/08). This opus dealt not only with Hegel, but also with Josef Kohler's philosophy intensively. In 1906, Berolzheimer even wrote an article on "J. Kohler as a philosopher of law" ("J. Kohler als Rechtsphilosoph").

Founding father Josef Kohler (1849–1919): Josef Kohler was born in Offenburg, Grand Duchy of Baden (southwestern Germany). After studying law in Freiburg and Heidelberg, Kohler at first worked as lawyer and later as a judge in Mannheim. In 1878 he was appointed professor for civil procedure in Würzburg, which is remarkable because even though Kohler was a doctor of law and was experienced in the practice of law, he was not officially qualified to give postdoctoral lectures. After ten years in Würzburg, Kohler in 1888 accepted a call to a chair in Berlin. It was Berlin which inspired him to go further, scientifically and as an artist. He died there after 30 years of tireless work in 1919.

Kohler and Berolzheimer: Kohler and Berolzheimer were as different as they could be. Berolzheimer was not, as Kohler, an unresting scientist, who "wants to deduce and thus conquer one sphere of being after the other". Other than Kohler, Berolzheimer was oriented "to the great principles fully". He was a "systematic", who subordinated "all findings to these principles". And he was "tirelessly" trying to "convince and persuade his fellow men and women of these principles."

Founding father Walter Rothschild (1879–1967): With Kohler and Berolzheimer there were two motivated and proficient authors. But they lacked somebody to give them a voice. The man to give Kohler and Berolzheimer this voice was young publisher Walther Rothschild (1879-1967), who was about to establish a publishing house for cultural studies and political philosophy. He made the duo a triumvirate. With regard to this triumvirate, Arthur Kohler, the son of Josef Kohler, reports: "Josef Kohler was a great inspirer and stimulator, though every detail had to be reviewed by him, and he entertained international connections and footing; Berolzheimer was particularly engaged in the details of editing and was a proficient organizer; Rothschild knew how to propagate expertly."

Rothschild Publishing House: The "Archive" originally was published by the Dr. Walther Rothschild Verlagsbuchhandlung (Dr. Walther Rothschild Publishing House). Established in 1905, Rothschild Publishing House soon became a well respected publisher for cultural studies, political philosophy, and philosophy of law. 
The fundamental idea of Rothschild Publishing House is well described by the following words celebrating its 25th anniversary in 1930: "The work of the scholar prospers in solitude. Trusting his own strain of thoughts alone and without any help, the scholar seeks to deduce the laws of the world, to find formulations that are valid. (...) For the scientific person, the penetration of the absolute means happiness and fulfillment. The general public is indifferent to this internal process, at first. The sphere of privacy will be crossed only when the publisher gives these thoughts a broader footing; when he makes a book out of a manuscript. In this way, ideas go out to the world. Printed work imparts results and further tasks to the scientific world. It creates intellectual currents which connect times and countries."
Historian Walter Rothschild (1879–1967; Doctor of philosophy 1902) was owner and leading figure of the Dr. Walther Rothschild Verlagsbuchhandlung (Dr. Walther Rothschild Publishing House). He was not related to the famous Jewish family of the same name. However, Rothschild was forced to withdraw from the publishing business in 1933. He then emigrated to the US, where he died in Carmel, California, in 1967.
In 1933, Rothschild Publishing House ceased publishing the "Archive". In the same year the publishing house "vanished" from the index of Berlin booksellers; the reason for this has not been clarified until now. The "Archive" was taken over by the "Verlag für Staatswissenschaften und Geschichte" (1933–38; "Publishing house for Political Sciences and History"), followed by the "Albert Limbach Verlag" (1938–1944).

IVR's founding organization 1909

IVR founding members 1909
166 Ppersons have been listed as Founding Members of the IVR in Oct. 1st, 1909 
Mainly they came from: Germany (96), Austria-Hungary (14), Netherlands (11), Switzerland (9), Italy (6), Russia (6).

IVR presidents and committee members 1909

Presidents: According to its Statute of 1909, the IVR was chaired by three presidents: Fritz Berolzheimer as Managing President (Geschäftsleitender Vorsitzender), Carl Fürstenberg as Financial President (Vorsitzender für die Vermögensangelegenheiten), and Josef Kohler as Honorary President (Ehrenpräsident).

Honorary Council: Moreover, the Statute of 1909 demanded a Council of Honorary Councillors from 15 non-German nations (Ehrenrat der außerdeutschen Kulturstaaten. Among these were well-known scholars like French sociologist Émile Durkheim and Italian legal philosopher. But among these councillors were also delegates from far-away countries like Ernesto Quesada from Buenos Aires (Argentina), Clovis Bevilaqua from Rio de Janeiro (Brazil) and Govindo Dàs from Benares (India).

Advisory Committee: The Managing President was also supported by an Advisory Committee consisting of 40 members, who were in charge for advisory opinions for important matters.

IVR Patrons: It was clear to the founders that the activities of the new association had to be financed. In order to fulfil this need, the IVR Statute of 1909 ruled that a patronage could be achieved by donating at least 1.000 Marks. In the history of the association, two persons opened up their wallets and served as IVR Patrons: Industrialist and maecenas Wilhelm Merton (1848–1916). He was the owner of the Metallgesellschaft, which was one of the largest industrial companies in the world. Merton is regarded as one of the most prominent industrialists in the Wilhelmenian period. Bankier Wilhelm von Pechmann (1859–1949), who was Directorate Member of the Bayerische Handelsbank München (Bavarian Merchant Bank). Patronage was abolished under the rule of the Statute of 1935/36.

IVR Protector: According to § 7 of the IVR statute of 1909, one could become Protektor of the association (meaning a patron). At this time, protectorate mainly was offered to nobility. In 1910, Ernest Louis, Grand Duke of Hesse and by Rhine (1868–1937; Reign 1892–1918) agreed to be an IVR Protector. The Grand Duke was a great patron of the arts; his motto was “My Hesse should flourish, and the art in Hesse too” (“Mein Hessenland blühe und in ihm die Kunst”). In his residence at the south Hessian city of Darmstadt, he was founder of the Darmstadt Artists' Colony with Art Nouveau buildings (in Germany commonly known as “Jugendstil”). It was this very city where the association's second congress took place in 1911. The Protectorate was abolished by the statute of 1935/36, one year before the death of the last Grand Duke of Hesse in 1937.

Early IVR congresses

First IVR congress in Berlin 1910: In May 1910, the first IVR Congress was held in Berlin at the Preußisches Herrenhaus (Prussian House of Lords). The Congress was attended by about 70 participants and 20 accompanying wives - mostly, but not all, Germans. The academic program, consisting of about 10 lectures, focused on basic questions of the philosophy of Law. Both founding fathers Kohler and Berolzheimer gave programmatic lectures: Kohler gave one on "Aufgaben und Ziele der Rechtsphilosophie" ("Tasks and Aims of Philosophy of Law") and Berolzheimer on "Der Methodenstreit in der Rechtsphilosophie der Gegenwart" ("Dispute over Method in current Philosophy of Law". A lecture was given by Walter Pollack using a diascope ("Lichtbilderdemonstration"). The social program of the first congress was quite modest: a welcoming evening at the Palace Hotel and two afternoon receptions at the home of Mr. and Mrs. Kohler and Mr. and Mrs. Fürstenberg (the latter having a grand villa in western Berlin, in Grunewald). In 1910 as well, Kohler was dean of the faculty of law, celebrating the jubilee of the university's founding. Under the aegis of dean Kohler, American president Roosevelt and the German Emperor were granted Honorary Doctors.

Second IVR Congress in Darmstadt 1911: In 1911, the second IVR congress took place in Darmstadt under the patronage of Ernest Louis, Grand Duke of Hesse and by Rhine (1868–1937). The congress was attended by about 120 delegates – many of them members from South Hessian judicial authority. On the second day, even the Grand Duke himself was attending the congress. The academic program consisted of about 12 lectures. Special attention was given to questions of reform, especially with regard to legal education and judicial training.

Third IVR Congress in Frankfurt 1914: In 1914, the third IVR congress took place in Frankfurt. Originally the congress was intended to take place at the Royal Academy in the east Prussian city of Posen (Poznań, now west-central Poland), but was relocated to Frankfurt. In Frankfurt, the congress took place at the Akademie für Sozial- und Handelswissenschaften (Academy for Social and Commercial Sciences). The academy was founded in 1901 and was financed by the city of Frankfurt. It became one of the founding institutions of the university in 1914. The congress was attended by about 170 delegates and concentrated on practical questions of law and economy; nevertheless, IVR Presidents Josef Kohler und Fritz Berolzheimer contributed programmed lectures on "Grenzen der Rechtsphilosophie" (Limits of the Philosophy of Law) and "Programm des Neo-Hegelianismus" (Programme of Neo-Hegelism).

Coincidentally, the congress files of the third congress have been preserved at the Frankfurt city archive: letters by the organizing committee, minutes of meetings. Even the invoice of the reception at the Römer (The Roman), Frankfurt town hall, has been preserved – by the way, the same place, the reception of the 25th World Congress will take place. The preserved writings provide an insight into the process of organizing a congress in the early days of the IVR. In fact, many matters the organizers had to arrange with, sound familiar: continuous meetings of the organizing committee; negotiations about favourable alternatives for accommodation and transport etc.; configuration of a social program (Geselligkeitsprogramm) for all participants, consisting of a city reception, a reception at the Frankfurt Chamber of Trade (Handelskammer), and an excursion to the reconstructed Roman fort Saalburg located on the Taunus ridge near famous spa town Bad Homburg. The reception at the Town hall was paid by the city of Frankfurt (in total 1092.90 Marks). Besides the cost of catering, this sum included cigars (35.35 Marks) and a red carpet at the Kaisertreppe (Emperor's staircase). The staircase was destroyed in World War II, but its portal has remained and can be seen during the City Reception.

Interwar period and dissolution
In the years 1919/1920, the Association had to bear a big loss – the passing of its founders Josef Kohler (†1919) and Fritz Berolzheimer (died 1920). The IVR was then presided by private law scholar Peter Klein (1880–1926), and after his death in 1925, by criminal law scholar Wilhelm Sauer (1879–1962) and Götz Briefs (1889–1974). The last congress of old series was held in Berlin in 1926. 

In 1933, two changes took place: firstly, the archive's name was changed to Archiv für Rechts- und Sozialphilosophie ("Archive for Philosophy of Law and Social Philosophy"); secondly, Rothschild Publishing House seized to publish the Archive and vanished from the index of Berlin booksellers – the reason for this has not been clarified until now. 

After the takeover of power by the National Socialists in 1933, Vice President Götz Briefs, being a Catholic social philosopher, was removed from office and forced to leave the country. He emigrated to the USA. After being a guest lecturer at the Catholic University in Washington D.C., he became a full Professor at Georgetown University in 1937.

In 1935, Carl August Emge (1886–1970) became president of the IVR and also editor of the Archive. Since 1933, Emge was a professor for philosophy of law at Berlin University. Concerning the political orientation, in 1948, it was emphasized in favor of Emge, "that the IVR was not subordinated to any other organization and maintained its apolitical, purely scientific character".

In 1944, the IVR was dissolved in the war confusion. At this time, the association had nearly 1000 members.

From resurrection to present time
After resurrection in 1948, the first IVR world congress was held in Saarbrücken (Germany) in 1957, followed by the Congress in Vienna (Austria), in 1959. After this, the world congresses were ordinarily organized every four years, occasionally supplemented by an extraordinary congress. Since 1981, the world congress is organized every two years (see box below). The first congress outside Europe was organized by Gray Dorsey (IVR President 1975-79) in St. Louis (USA) in 1975. Before this, the IVR primarily was a European organization with a few national sections abroad, the largest in Japan and in the USA. During the presidency of Dorsey, the IVR became a worldwide organization. Soon after the congress in St. Louis, Congresses were held in Australia (Sydney & Canberra 1977), Mexico (Mexico City 1981), Japan (Kobe 1987), and Argentina (La Plata-Buenos Aires 1997).

Structure
The association has over 2000 members worldwide. They are organized in 41 national sections, which are autonomous with respect to the organization of their events and also solely responsible for their financial affairs.

National sections (in alphabetical order)

Governance
The association is governed by its Executive Committee, which is chaired by the association's president. The president is elected by the members.

Present Executive Committee and President

IVR Executive Committee 2019/23

Past executive committees and presidents
The following persons have served as Presidents of the Association:

Executive Committee 1909
 Fritz Berolzheimer – Managing President 1909-1920
 Josef Kohler – Honorary President 1909-19
 Carl Fürstenberg – President of Finances 1909–?? (not later than 1924)

Executive Committee 1919/20-1933/34
 Peter Klein – Managing President 1919/20-25/26 (†1925)
 Carl Fürstenberg – President of Finances 1909–?? (not later than 1924)
 Walter Rothschild – President of Finances 1924–?? (not later than 1935)
 Friedrich von Wieser – Honorary President 1924-26 (†1926)
 Leopold von Wenger – Honorary President 1924-??
 Ernst Zitelmann – Honorary President 1921-23

Executive Committee 1925/26-1933/34
 Wilhelm Sauer – Managing President 1925/26-approx. 1935
 Götz Briefs – Vice President 1926-1933/34 (removed from office)

Executive Committee 1935-1944
 Carl August Emge – President 1935–1944

Executive Committee 1948-1953
 Rudolf von Laun – First President 1948–53
 Wilhelm Szilasi – Second President 1948–53
 Ulrich Klug – Third President 1948–53

Executive Committee 1953-1957
 Julius Ebbinghaus – First President 1953–57
 Ulrich Klug – Second President 1953–57
 Wilhelm Szilasi – Third President 1953–57

Executive Committee 1957-1959
 Rudolf von Laun – President 1957-59
 Otto Brusiin – Vice President 1957-59
 Dieter Gunst – Schriftführer 1957-59

IVR Presidents 1959-83
 Rudolf von Laun – President 1959-63
 Peter Schneider – President 1963-67
 Alessandro Passerin d'Entrèves – President 1967-71
 Chaïm Perelman – President 1971-75
 Gray Dorsey – President 1975-79
 Paul Trappe – President 1979-83
 Aulis Aarnio – President 1983-87 
 Alice Ehr-Soon Tay – President 1987-91
 Ralf Dreier – President 1991-95 
 Enrico Pattaro – President 1995–99
 Eugenio Bulygin – President 1999–2003
 Alexander Peczenik – President 2003-05
 Marek Zirk-Sadowski – Acting President 2006-07
 Neil MacCormick – President 2007–09
 Yasutomo Morigiwa – Acting President 2009-2011
 Ulfrid Neumann – President 2011-2015
 Mortimer Sellers – President 2015–2019.

Publications
The Archive for Philosophy of Law and Social Philosophy (Archiv für Rechts- und Sozialphilosophie, ARSP) contains scholarly peer-reviewed articles in various languages (inter alia German, English, French and Spanish) on legal and social philosophy. It is published in annual volumes as well as special issues (Beihefte). The editor-in-chief of the ARSP is Prof. Dr. Ulfrid Neumann. It is under the editorial supervision of Dr. Annette Brockmöller.

The American section of the International Association for the Philosophy of Law and Social Philosophy (Amintaphil) publishes the book series Amintaphil: The Philosophical Foundations of Law and Justice.

Conferences

Old series conferences 1910–1926
List of Old series conferences
 1910 Berlin, Germany (first IVR Congress of old series)
 1911 Darmstadt, Germany
 1914 Frankfurt, Germany
 1926 Berlin, Germany, Germany

New series conferences 1957–present
List of New series conferences

Trivia

Founding era - Editorial meetings held at Café
As we get to know by Arthur Kohler, the son of IVR's Founding father Josef Kohler, in former times the Archive's editorial meeting were held at the Romanisches Café in Berlin (Romanesque Cafe). The Romanisches Café was located in the ground floor of a neo-romanesque building complex vis-à-vis to the famous Kaiser-Wilhelm-Gedächtniskirche (Kaiser Wilhelm Memorial Church) in western Berlin, which was also built in romanesque style. Towards the end of World War I, the Café became the meeting place of the bohemian society of Berlin, especially after the "Café des Westens" (Café of the West), a famous artists‘ café, had to relocate and was shut down in 1915. Every group had its regulars table – painters, philosophers, journalists, critics, dramatists, essayists, psychoanalysts. Following a secret hierarchy, the café was divided in two sections: a place called "nonswimmer pond" (Nichtschwimmer-Bassin) for guests and tourists, and the "swimmer pond" (Schwimmer-Bassin) for regulars, celebrities and – on a gallery – chess players. The permission to enter the swimmer pond had to be worked on hard and was strictly controlled by the doorman.

German author and satirist Erich Kästner reports: "The Romanisches Café is the ante room for talents. There are people who have been waiting here for twenty years, every day, for talent. They possess, if nothing else, the ability to wait to an extraordinary degree. (...) They are an infernal mass of eccentrics and those who would like to be so. The first impression is: Hair, manes, curls that fall into eyes, fraught with meaning. The second impression: How often do they change their underwear? This impression may be unjustified in many cases. But on the other hand, nothing could be more distinctive for the seen, than that one has this impression in the first place."

Founding father Arthur Kohler – a legal graphomaniac
2482 publications derive from Kohler's hand. The bibliography from 1931/12, which was compiled by his son Arthur Kohler in 10 years of work, enlists publications concerning truly to all branches of law such as Patent Law, Intellectual Property Law, and Comparative Law. Moreover, Kohler was artistically active, composing music and poetry. It has been calculated that Kohler in average published one paper a week; and his son reports of 20 hour shifts. For his contemporary colleagues, this overwhelming creative power was either criticized because of its sketchiness or admired as product of the last "universal scholar", sometimes this creativity was even perceived as "eerie" (surely, "the greatest legal graphomaniac of all times and worlds.")

Bibliography

Founding documents
 Kohler, Josef / Berolzheimer, Fritz, Einführung, in: ARWP, Vol. 1, 1907/08, p. 1 f. Reprinted in: Ziemann (ed.), Archiv für Rechts- und Sozialphilosophie: Bibliographie und Dokumentation (1907-2009), 2010, p. 410 (Archives's Founding declaration from 1907).
 Kohler, Josef / Berolzheimer, Fritz, Die Begründung einer Internationalen Vereinigung für Rechts- und Wirtschaftsphilosophie samt den Gesetzgebungsfragen (I.V.R), in: ARWP, Vol. 3, 1909/10, p. 435-437. Reprinted in: Ziemann (ed.), Archiv für Rechts- und Sozialphilosophie: Bibliographie und Dokumentation (1907-2009), 2010, p. 410-412 (IVR's Founding declaration from 1909).

Selected bibliography
 Brockmöller, Annette (ed.), Hundert Jahre Archiv für Rechts- und Sozialphilosophie (1907-2007): Auswahl 14 bedeutender Aufsätze von Kelsen, Radbruch, Luhmann u.a. (Series: ARSP-Beiheft, Vol. 112), Stuttgart 2007 (Collection of articles published in the „Archive for Philosophy of Law and Social Philosophy“ from 1909 to 2007).
 Brockmöller, Annette & Hilgendorf, Eric (eds.), Rechtsphilosophie im 20. Jahrhundert – 100 Jahre Archiv für Rechts- und Sozialphilosophie. Beiträge der Arbeitstagung „Rechtsphilosophie im Wandel der Gesellschaft“ vom 25. bis 27. Oktober 2007 in Bielefeld (Series: ARSP-Beiheft Vol. 116), Stuttgart 2009.
 Brusiin, Otto, Zum 50jährigen Bestehen der internationalen Vereinigung für Rechts- und Sozialphilosophie, in: International Association for the Philosophy of Law and Social Philosophy. Vorträge des IVR-Kongresses 1959 in Wien (Series: ARSP-Beiheft Vol. 38, New Series Vol. 1), 1960, p. 1-12 (English Summary at 13-14).
 Kohler, Arthur, Von der Wiege des Archivs, in: ARWP Vol. 24 (1930/31), p. 3–6, Ziemann, p. 412-413. Reprinted in: Ziemann (ed.), Archiv für Rechts- und Sozialphilosophie: Bibliographie und Dokumentation (1907-2009), 2010.
 Lotze, Lothar & Schier, Walter, Fritz Berolzheimer und das ARSP, in: ARSP Vol. 73 (1987), p. 15–29. 
 Mollnau, Karl A. (ed.), Die Internationale Vereinigung für Rechts- und Sozialphilosophie und ihre Zeitschrift: Bibliographie, Statuten, Wirkungsgeschichtliches (Series: ARSP-Beiheft, Vol. 38), Stuttgart 1989.
 Mollnau, Karl A., Einleitung. Verein einer Zeitschrift oder Zeitschrift eines Vereins?, in: Mollnau (ed.), Die Internationale Vereinigung für Rechts- und Sozialphilosophie und ihre Zeitschrift: Bibliographie, Statuten, Wirkungsgeschichtliches (Series: ARSP-Beiheft, Vol. 38), 1989, p. 7–15. Reprinted in: Ziemann (ed.), Archiv für Rechts- und Sozialphilosophie: Bibliographie und Dokumentation (1907-2009), 2010, p. 424-429.
 Mollnau, Karl A., Eine Liaison zwischen Rechtsphilosophie und Gesetzgebung. Skizze anhand der frühen Jahrgänge des Archivs für Rechts- und Wirtschaftsphilosophie, in: Sprenger (ed.), Deutsche Rechts- und Sozialphilosophie um 1900. Zugleich ein Beitrag zur Gründungsgeschichte der Internationalen Vereinigung für Rechts- und Sozialphilosophie (IVR) (Series: ARSP-Beiheft, Vol. 43), Stuttgart 1991, p. 111–120.
 Sprenger, Gerhard (ed.), Deutsche Rechts- und Sozialphilosophie um 1900. Zugleich ein Beitrag zur Gründungsgeschichte der Internationalen Vereinigung für Rechts- und Sozialphilosophie (IVR) (Series: ARSP-Beiheft, Vol. 43), Stuttgart 1991 (Collection of articles on the history of the IVR).
 Sprenger, Gerhard, Das Archiv für Rechts- und Sozial(Wirtschafts)philosophie als Zeit-Schrift des Rechtsdenkens 1907–1987, in: ARSP Vol. 73 (1987), p. 1–14. Reprinted in: Ziemann (ed.), Archiv für Rechts- und Sozialphilosophie: Bibliographie und Dokumentation (1907-2009), 2010, p. 414-423.
 Sprenger, Gerhard, 100 Jahre Rechtsphilosophie: eine Rückbesinnung entlang des 1907 gegründeten „Archiv für Rechts- und Wirtschaftsphilosophie“, in: Brockmöller & Hilgendorf (eds.), Rechtsphilosophie im 20. Jahrhundert – 100 Jahre Archiv für Rechts- und Sozialphilosophie (Series: ARSP-Beiheft Vol. 116), Stuttgart 2009, p. 9–35.
 Wellman, Carl, One Hundred Years of the IVR, in: ARSP Vol. 95, 2009, p. 1-13.
 Ziemann, Sascha, Archiv für Rechts- und Sozialphilosophie: Bibliographie und Dokumentation (1907-2009) (Series: ARSP-Beiheft, Vol. 123), Stuttgart 2010 (Bibliography on the „Archive for Philosophy of Law and Social Philosophy“).

References

External links

Facebook Fan page
German Section

International learned societies
Philosophy organizations
Philosophy of law
Social philosophy